The Ministry of Health is a ministry in Zambia. Its head offices are located in Lusaka.

Operations
Subsidiary organizations include the Central Board of Health and the National Malaria Control Centre.

Healthcare facilities run by the Ministry are categorised into Urban Health Centers and Rural Health Centres (or Health Posts).

Schools operated by the Ministry include the Mansa School of Nursing in Mansa and the Ndola Schools of Nursing and Midwifery in Ndola District.

List of ministers

Deputy ministers

References

External links
Official website

 
Health
Health in Zambia
Zambia